Analysis is the branch of mathematics dealing with continuous functions, limits, and related theories, such as differentiation, integration, measure, infinite sequences, series, and analytic functions.

These theories are usually studied in the context of real and complex numbers and functions. Analysis evolved from calculus, which involves the elementary concepts and techniques of analysis.
Analysis may be distinguished from geometry; however, it can be applied to any space of mathematical objects that has a definition of nearness (a topological space) or specific distances between objects  (a metric space).

History

Ancient
Mathematical analysis formally developed in the 17th century during the Scientific Revolution, but many of its ideas can be traced back to earlier mathematicians. Early results in analysis were implicitly present in the early days of ancient Greek mathematics. For instance, an infinite geometric sum is implicit in Zeno's paradox of the dichotomy. (Strictly speaking, the point of the paradox is to deny that the infinite sum exists.) Later, Greek mathematicians such as Eudoxus and Archimedes made more explicit, but informal, use of the concepts of limits and convergence when they used the method of exhaustion to compute the area and volume of regions and solids. The explicit use of infinitesimals appears in Archimedes' The Method of Mechanical Theorems, a work rediscovered in the 20th century. In Asia, the Chinese mathematician Liu Hui used the method of exhaustion in the 3rd century AD to find the area of a circle. From Jain literature, it appears that Hindus were in possession of the formulae for the sum of the arithmetic and geometric series as early as the 4th century B.C.
Ācārya Bhadrabāhu uses the sum of a geometric series in his Kalpasūtra in 433 B.C. In Indian mathematics, particular instances of arithmetic series have been found to implicitly occur in Vedic Literature as early as 2000 B.C.

Medieval
Zu Chongzhi established a method that would later be called Cavalieri's principle to find the volume of a sphere in the 5th century. In the 12th century, the Indian mathematician Bhāskara II gave examples of derivatives and used what is now known as Rolle's theorem.

In the 14th century, Madhava of Sangamagrama developed infinite series expansions, now called Taylor series, of functions such as sine, cosine, tangent and arctangent. Alongside his development of Taylor series of trigonometric functions, he also estimated the magnitude of the error terms resulting of truncating these series, and gave a rational approximation of some infinite series.  His followers at the Kerala School of Astronomy and Mathematics further expanded his works, up to the 16th century.

Modern

Foundations
The modern foundations of mathematical analysis were established in 17th century Europe. This began when Fermat and Descartes developed analytic geometry, which is the precursor to modern calculus. Fermat's method of adequality allowed him to determine the maxima and minima of functions and the tangents of curves. Descartes's publication of La Géométrie in 1637, which introduced the Cartesian coordinate system, is considered to be the establishment of mathematical analysis. It would be a few decades later that Newton and Leibniz independently developed infinitesimal calculus, which grew, with the stimulus of applied work that continued through the 18th century, into analysis topics such as the calculus of variations, ordinary and partial differential equations, Fourier analysis, and generating functions. During this period, calculus techniques were applied to approximate discrete problems by continuous ones.

Modernization
In the 18th century, Euler introduced the notion of mathematical function. Real analysis began to emerge as an independent subject when Bernard Bolzano introduced the modern definition of continuity in 1816, but Bolzano's work did not become widely known until the 1870s. In 1821, Cauchy began to put calculus on a firm logical foundation by rejecting the principle of the generality of algebra widely used in earlier work, particularly by Euler.  Instead, Cauchy formulated calculus in terms of geometric ideas and infinitesimals.  Thus, his definition of continuity required an infinitesimal change in x to correspond to an infinitesimal change in y.  He also introduced the concept of the Cauchy sequence, and started the formal theory of complex analysis. Poisson, Liouville, Fourier and others studied partial differential equations and harmonic analysis.  The contributions of these mathematicians and others, such as Weierstrass, developed the (ε, δ)-definition of limit approach, thus founding the modern field of mathematical analysis. Around the same time, Riemann introduced his theory of integration, and made significant advances in complex analysis.

Towards the end of the 19th century, mathematicians started worrying that they were assuming the existence of a continuum of real numbers without proof. Dedekind then constructed the real numbers by Dedekind cuts, in which irrational numbers are formally defined, which serve to fill the "gaps" between rational numbers, thereby creating a complete set: the continuum of real numbers, which had already been developed by Simon Stevin in terms of decimal expansions. Around that time, the attempts to refine the theorems of Riemann integration led to the study of the "size" of the set of discontinuities of real functions.

Also, various pathological objects, (such as nowhere continuous functions, continuous but nowhere differentiable functions, and space-filling curves), commonly known as "monsters", began to be investigated. In this context, Jordan developed his theory of measure, Cantor developed what is now called naive set theory, and Baire proved the Baire category theorem. In the early 20th century, calculus was formalized using an axiomatic set theory. Lebesgue greatly improved measure theory, and introduced his own theory of integration, now known as Lebesgue integration, which proved to be a big improvement over Riemann's. Hilbert introduced Hilbert spaces to solve integral equations. The idea of normed vector space was in the air, and in the 1920s Banach created functional analysis.

Important concepts

Metric spaces 

In mathematics, a metric space is a set where a notion of distance (called a metric) between elements of the set is defined.

Much of analysis happens in some metric space; the most commonly used are the real line, the complex plane, Euclidean space, other vector spaces, and the integers. Examples of analysis without a metric include measure theory (which describes size rather than distance) and functional analysis (which studies topological vector spaces that need not have any sense of distance).

such that for any , the following holds:

 , with equality if and only if     (identity of indiscernibles),
     (symmetry), and
     (triangle inequality).

By taking the third property and letting , it can be shown that      (non-negative).

Sequences and limits 

A sequence is an ordered list. Like a set, it contains members (also called elements, or terms). Unlike a set, order matters, and exactly the same elements can appear multiple times at different positions in the sequence. Most precisely, a sequence can be defined as a function whose domain is a countable totally ordered set, such as the natural numbers.

One of the most important properties of a sequence is convergence. Informally, a sequence converges if it has a limit. Continuing informally, a (singly-infinite) sequence has a limit if it approaches some point x, called the limit, as n becomes very large. That is, for an abstract sequence (an) (with n running from 1 to infinity understood) the distance between an and x approaches 0 as n → ∞, denoted

Main branches

Real analysis 

Real analysis (traditionally, the theory of functions of a real variable) is a branch of mathematical analysis dealing with the real numbers and real-valued functions of a real variable. In particular, it deals with the analytic properties of real functions and sequences, including convergence and limits of sequences of real numbers, the calculus of the real numbers, and continuity, smoothness and related properties of real-valued functions.

Complex analysis 

Complex analysis (traditionally known as the theory of functions of a complex variable) is the branch of mathematical analysis that investigates functions of complex numbers. It is useful in many branches of mathematics, including algebraic geometry, number theory, applied mathematics; as well as in physics, including hydrodynamics, thermodynamics, mechanical engineering, electrical engineering, and particularly, quantum field theory.

Complex analysis is particularly concerned with the analytic functions of complex variables (or, more generally, meromorphic functions). Because the separate real and imaginary parts of any analytic function must satisfy Laplace's equation, complex analysis is widely applicable to two-dimensional problems in physics.

Functional analysis 

Functional analysis is a branch of mathematical analysis, the core of which is formed by the study of vector spaces endowed with some kind of limit-related structure (e.g. inner product, norm, topology, etc.) and the linear operators acting upon these spaces and respecting these structures in a suitable sense. The historical roots of functional analysis lie in the study of spaces of functions and the formulation of properties of transformations of functions such as the Fourier transform as transformations defining continuous, unitary etc. operators between function spaces.  This point of view turned out to be particularly useful for the study of differential and integral equations.

Harmonic analysis 

Harmonic analysis is a branch of mathematical analysis concerned with the representation of functions and signals as the superposition of basic waves. This includes the study of the notions of Fourier series and Fourier transforms (Fourier analysis), and of their generalizations. Harmonic analysis has applications in areas as diverse as music theory, number theory, representation theory, signal processing, quantum mechanics, tidal analysis, and neuroscience.

Differential equations 

A differential equation is a mathematical equation for an unknown function of one or several variables that relates the values of the function itself and its derivatives of various orders. Differential equations play a prominent role in engineering, physics, economics, biology, and other disciplines.

Differential equations arise in many areas of science and technology, specifically whenever a deterministic relation involving some continuously varying quantities (modeled by functions) and their rates of change in space or time (expressed as derivatives) is known or postulated. This is illustrated in classical mechanics, where the motion of a body is described by its position and velocity as the time value varies. Newton's laws allow one (given the position, velocity, acceleration and various forces acting on the body) to express these variables dynamically as a differential equation for the unknown position of the body as a function of time. In some cases, this differential equation (called an equation of motion) may be solved explicitly.

Measure theory 

A measure on a set is a systematic way to assign a number to each suitable subset of that set, intuitively interpreted as its size. In this sense, a measure is a generalization of the concepts of length, area, and volume. A particularly important example is the Lebesgue measure on a Euclidean space, which assigns the conventional length, area, and volume of Euclidean geometry to suitable subsets of the -dimensional Euclidean space . For instance, the Lebesgue measure of the interval  in the real numbers is its length in the everyday sense of the word – specifically, 1.

Technically, a measure is a function that assigns a non-negative real number or +∞ to (certain) subsets of a set . It must assign 0 to the empty set and be (countably) additive: the measure of a 'large' subset that can be decomposed into a finite (or countable) number of 'smaller' disjoint subsets, is the sum of the measures of the "smaller" subsets. In general, if one wants to associate a consistent size to each subset of a given set while satisfying the other axioms of a measure, one only finds trivial examples like the counting measure. This problem was resolved by defining measure only on a sub-collection of all subsets; the so-called measurable subsets, which are required to form a -algebra. This means that countable unions, countable intersections and complements of measurable subsets are measurable. Non-measurable sets in a Euclidean space, on which the Lebesgue measure cannot be defined consistently, are necessarily complicated in the sense of being badly mixed up with their complement. Indeed, their existence is a non-trivial consequence of the axiom of choice.

Numerical analysis 

Numerical analysis is the study of algorithms that use numerical approximation (as opposed to general symbolic manipulations) for the problems of mathematical analysis (as distinguished from discrete mathematics).

Modern numerical analysis does not seek exact answers, because exact answers are often impossible to obtain in practice. Instead, much of numerical analysis is concerned with obtaining approximate solutions while maintaining reasonable bounds on errors.

Numerical analysis naturally finds applications in all fields of engineering and the physical sciences, but in the 21st century, the life sciences and even the arts have adopted elements of scientific computations. Ordinary differential equations appear in celestial mechanics (planets, stars and galaxies); numerical linear algebra is important for data analysis; stochastic differential equations and Markov chains are essential in simulating living cells for medicine and biology.

Vector analysis 

Vector analysis is a branch of mathematical analysis dealing with values which have both magnitude and direction. Some examples of vectors include velocity, force, and displacement. Vectors are commonly associated with scalars, values which describe magnitude.

Scalar analysis 

Scalar analysis is a branch of mathematical analysis dealing with values related to scale as opposed to direction. Values such as temperature are scalar because they describe the magnitude of a value without regard to direction, force, or displacement that value may or may not have.

Tensor analysis

Other topics 
 Calculus of variations deals with extremizing functionals, as opposed to ordinary calculus which deals with functions.
 Harmonic analysis deals with the representation of functions or signals as the superposition of basic waves.
 Geometric analysis involves the use of geometrical methods in the study of partial differential equations and the application of the theory of partial differential equations to geometry.
 Clifford analysis, the study of Clifford valued functions that are annihilated by Dirac or Dirac-like operators,  termed in general as monogenic or Clifford analytic functions.
 p-adic analysis, the study of analysis within the context of p-adic numbers, which differs in some interesting and surprising ways from its real and complex counterparts.
 Non-standard analysis, which investigates the hyperreal numbers and their functions and gives a rigorous treatment of infinitesimals and infinitely large numbers.
 Computable analysis, the study of which parts of analysis can be carried out in a computable manner.
 Stochastic calculus – analytical notions developed for stochastic processes.
 Set-valued analysis – applies ideas from analysis and topology to set-valued functions.
 Convex analysis, the study of convex sets and functions.
 Idempotent analysis – analysis in the context of an idempotent semiring, where the lack of an additive inverse is compensated somewhat by the idempotent rule A + A = A.
 Tropical analysis  – analysis of the idempotent semiring called the tropical semiring (or max-plus algebra/min-plus algebra).
Constructive analysis, which is built upon a foundation of constructive, rather than classical, logic and set theory.
Intuitionistic analysis, which is developed from constructive logic like constructive analysis but also incorporates choice sequences.
Paraconsistent analysis, which is built upon a foundation of paraconsistent, rather than classical, logic and set theory.
Smooth infinitesimal analysis, which is developed in a smooth topos.

Applications 
Techniques from analysis are also found in other areas such as:

Physical sciences 
The vast majority of classical mechanics, relativity, and quantum mechanics is based on applied analysis, and differential equations in particular. Examples of important differential equations include Newton's second law, the Schrödinger equation, and the Einstein field equations.

Functional analysis is also a major factor in quantum mechanics.

Signal processing 
When processing signals, such as audio, radio waves, light waves, seismic waves, and even images, Fourier analysis can isolate individual components of a compound waveform, concentrating them for easier detection or removal.  A large family of signal processing techniques consist of Fourier-transforming a signal, manipulating the Fourier-transformed data in a simple way, and reversing the transformation.

Other areas of mathematics 
Techniques from analysis are used in many areas of mathematics, including:
 Analytic number theory
 Analytic combinatorics
 Continuous probability
 Differential entropy in information theory
 Differential games
 Differential geometry, the application of calculus to specific mathematical spaces known as manifolds that possess a complicated internal structure but behave in a simple manner locally.
 Differentiable manifolds
 Differential topology
 Partial differential equations

Famous Textbooks 
 Foundation of Analysis: The Arithmetic of Whole Rational, Irrational and Complex Numbers, by Edmund Landau  
 Introductory Real Analysis, by Andrey Kolmogorov, Sergei Fomin
 Differential and Integral Calculus (3 volumes), by Grigorii Fichtenholz
 The Fundamentals of Mathematical Analysis (2 volumes), by Grigorii Fichtenholz
 A Course Of Mathematical Analysis (2 volumes), by Sergey Nikolsky
 Mathematical Analysis (2 volumes), by Vladimir Zorich
 A Course of Higher Mathematics (5 volumes, 6 parts), by Vladimir Smirnov
 Differential And Integral Calculus, by Nikolai Piskunov
 A Course of Mathematical Analysis, by Aleksandr Khinchin
 Mathematical Analysis: A Special Course, by Georgiy Shilov
 Theory of Functions of a Real Variable (2 volumes), by Isidor Natanson
 Problems in Mathematical Analysis, by Boris Demidovich
 Problems and Theorems in Analysis (2 volumes), by George Polya, Gabor Szegö
 Mathematical Analysis: A Modern Approach to Advanced Calculus, by Tom Apostol
 Principles of Mathematical Analysis, by Walter Rudin
 Real Analysis: Measure Theory, Integration, and Hilbert Spaces, by Elias Stein
 Complex Analysis, by Elias Stein
 Functional Analysis: Introduction to Further Topics in Analysis, by Elias Stein
 Analysis (2 volumes), by Terence Tao
 Analysis (3 volumes), by Herbert Amann, Joachim Escher
 Real and Functional Analysis, by Vladimir Bogachev, Oleg Smolyanov
 Real and Functional Analysis, by Serge Lang

See also 

 Constructive analysis
 History of calculus
 Hypercomplex analysis
 Multiple rule-based problems
 Multivariable calculus
 Paraconsistent logic
 Smooth infinitesimal analysis
 Timeline of calculus and mathematical analysis

References

Further reading 
   (NB. 3 softcover volumes in slipcase. Original Russian title in March 1956: Математика, ее содержание, методы и значение . First English edition in 6 volumes by AMS in 1962/1963, revised English edition in 3 volumes by MIT Press in August 1964: , 2nd printing by MIT Press in April 1965. First MIT paperback edition in March 1969. Reprinted in one volume by Dover.)
 
 
 
 
 
 
 
 
  (vi+608 pages) (reprinted: 1935, 1940, 1946, 1950, 1952, 1958, 1962, 1963, 1992)

External links

 Earliest Known Uses of Some of the Words of Mathematics: Calculus & Analysis
 Basic Analysis: Introduction to Real Analysis by Jiri Lebl (Creative Commons BY-NC-SA)
 Mathematical Analysis-Encyclopædia Britannica
 Calculus and Analysis